Hilde Schramm ( Speer; 17 April 1936) is a German politician for Alliance 90/The Greens (Bündnis 90/Die Grünen). Internationally she is best known as the daughter of the German architect and high-ranked Nazi Party official Albert Speer (1905–1981), and the younger sister of Albert Speer Jr. (1934–2017).

Biography 
As a teenager, Schramm was awarded an American Field Service scholarship to study in the United States. The US government initially refused her a visa, but reversed its decision in the face of publicity, including offers of hospitality from several families (some of them Jewish).

Schramm became a prominent European political figure who distinguished herself for helping victims of anti-semitism and Nazi atrocities. In 1994, she was awarded the Moses Mendelssohn Award from Berlin for her work. Schramm is active in politics, and has been a leader of the Green Party in Berlin. She has served as member of the Berlin House of Representatives from 1985 to 1987 and 1989 to 1991 and its Vice President between 1989 and 1990.

Schramm had a lengthy correspondence with her father while he was in Spandau Prison, from which he was released in October 1966.

References

External links 

 Hilde Schramm in an interview: 'I feel ashamed'
 Schramm receives the Moses Mendelssohn Award

1936 births
Living people
German sociologists
Alliance 90/The Greens politicians
Speer family
20th-century German women politicians